The 2019 AFC Cup qualifying play-offs were played from 5 February to 13 March 2019. A total of 11 teams competed in the qualifying play-offs to decide four of the 36 places in the group stage of the 2019 AFC Cup.

Teams
The following 11 teams, split into five zones (West Asia Zone, Central Asia Zone, South Asia Zone, ASEAN Zone, East Asia Zone), entered the qualifying play-offs, consisting of two rounds:
6 teams entered in the preliminary round.
5 teams entered in the play-off round.

Format

In the qualifying play-offs, each tie was played on a home-and-away two-legged basis. The away goals rule, extra time (away goals do not apply in extra time) and penalty shoot-out were used to decide the winner if necessary (Regulations Article 9.3). The four winners of the play-off round (one each from West Asia Zone, Central Asia Zone, South Asia Zone, East Asia Zone) advanced to the group stage to join the 32 direct entrants.

Schedule
The schedule of each round was as follows.

Bracket

The bracket of the qualifying play-offs for each zone, determined based on the association ranking of each team, with the team from the higher-ranked association hosting the second leg, was officially announced by the AFC prior to the group stage draw on 22 November 2018.

Play-off West Asia
 Hilal Al-Quds advanced to Group A.

Play-off Central Asia
 Khujand advanced to Group D.

Play-off South Asia
 Chennaiyin advanced to Group E.

Play-off East Asia
 Tai Po advanced to Group I.

Preliminary round

Summary
A total of six teams played in the preliminary round.

|+Central Asia Zone

|+South Asia Zone

|+East Asia Zone

Central Asia Zone

Ahal won 3–1 on aggregate.

South Asia Zone

Colombo won 9–2 on aggregate.

East Asia Zone

Ryomyong won 6–0 on aggregate.

Play-off round

Summary
A total of eight teams played in the play-off round: five teams which entered in this round, and three winners of the preliminary round.

|+West Asia Zone

|+Central Asia Zone

|+South Asia Zone

|+East Asia Zone

West Asia Zone

Hilal Al-Quds won 3–1 on aggregate.

Central Asia Zone

1–1 on aggregate. Khujand won on away goals.

South Asia Zone

Chennaiyin won 1–0 on aggregate.

East Asia Zone

0–0 on aggregate. Tai Po won 5–3 on penalties.

Notes

References

External links
, the-AFC.com
AFC Cup 2019, stats.the-AFC.com

1
February 2019 sports events in Asia
March 2019 sports events in Asia